Vivian G. Cobbe (born 1934) is an Irish retired hurler who played at club level with St. Patrick's, at inter-county level with Limerick and at inter-provincial level with Munster.

Career

From the St. Patrick's club, Cobbe first came to prominence on the inter-county scene with the Limerick junior team that overcame London to win the 1955 All-Ireland Junior Championship. Promotion to the senior side followed, with Cobbe lining out in the forwards when Limerick surprised Clare to win the 1955 Munster Championship. The team, labelled "Mackey's Greyhounds" after their trainer Mick Mackey, were subsequently beaten by eventual champions Wexford in the All-Ireland semi-final. Cobbe continued playing for Limerick until the 1960s, by which time he had also won two Railway Cup medals with Munster.

Honours

Limerick
Munster Senior Hurling Championship: 1955
All-Ireland Junior Hurling Championship: 1954
Munster Junior Hurling Championship: 1954

Munster
Railway Cup: 1957, 1958

References

1934 births
Living people
St Patrick's (Limerick) hurlers
Limerick inter-county hurlers
Munster inter-provincial hurlers